Governor Chittendon may refer to:

Martin Chittenden (1763–1840), 7th Governor of Vermont, son of Thomas Chittenden.
Thomas Chittenden (1730–1797), 1st Governor of Vermont